Louis Harrington "Scoop" Lewry,  (April 16, 1919 – February 25, 1992) was a Canadian politician and reporter.

Born in Moose Jaw, Saskatchewan, he was elected as an alderman on the Moose Jaw City Council in 1948. Lewry later became mayor of the city in 1950 and served in this role until 1956. He was married to Jean Lewry (née Munroe), and had five children, Philip (Doreen Ludke), Catherine (Robert Patterson), Janet, Harold, and Mary (Roger Rothwell). He had 13 grandchildren and 7 great grandchildren.

In 1957, he ran and won in a close race for the position of Member of Parliament for Moose Jaw—Lake Centre as a Co-operative Commonwealth Federation candidate. He ran again in 1958, losing widely to J. Ernest Pascoe in the Diefenbaker landslide. Pascoe was the same Conservative candidate he had defeated a year earlier.

He then served as mayor again, from 1965 to 1970 and, in a third term of office, from 1983 to 1988.

In 1980, he was made a Member of the Order of Canada.

External links
 

1919 births
1992 deaths
Co-operative Commonwealth Federation MPs
20th-century Canadian politicians
Members of the Order of Canada
Members of the House of Commons of Canada from Saskatchewan
Mayors of Moose Jaw